Ekaterina Alexandrova was the defending champion, but lost in the quarterfinals to Antonia Lottner.

Monica Niculescu won the title, defeating Lottner in the final 6–4, 6–2.

Seeds

Draw

Finals

Top half

Bottom half

Qualifying

Seeds

Qualifiers

Lucky loser
  Andrea Gámiz

Qualifying draw

First qualifier

Second qualifier

Third qualifier

Fourth qualifier

External Links
 Main draw
 Qualifying draw

Open de Limoges - Singles
Open de Limoges